Camp Bragg was a major Confederate encampment located in Ouachita (present-day Nevada) County, Arkansas, about  southwest of Camden. It served as Headquarters of the District of Arkansas from October 1863 until January 1864, when it was replaced by Camp Sumter, Arkansas.

History 
The evacuation of Little Rock, the state capital, by the Confederate District of Arkansas in the fall of 1863 dictated the need for a new headquarters location. Camp Bragg, presumably named for General Braxton Bragg, was "situated on a pine ridge with a steep hollow on one side, and a swamp on the other."

References

Sources 

 
 
 

1863 establishments in Arkansas
1864 disestablishments in Arkansas
American Civil War sites in Arkansas
Arkansas in the American Civil War
Braxton Bragg
History of Nevada County, Arkansas
Hope micropolitan area
Bragg
Bragg, Camp
Bragg, Camp
Bragg
Trans-Mississippi Department